Colorado River is a river of Costa Rica.

References

rivers of Costa Rica